The following outline is provided as an overview of and topical guide to Namibia:

Namibia – sovereign country located along the Atlantic Coast of Southern Africa. Namibia shares borders with Angola and Zambia to the north, Botswana to the east, and South Africa to the south. It gained independence from South Africa in 1990 and its capital city is Windhoek. Namibia is a member state of the United Nations (UN), the Southern African Development Community (SADC), the African Union (AU), and the Commonwealth of Nations. It is named after the Namib Desert.

General reference 

 Pronunciation: 
 Common English country name:  Namibia
 Official English country name:  The Republic of Namibia
 Common endonym(s):  
 Official endonym(s):  
 Adjectival(s): Namibian
 Demonym(s): Namibian
 International rankings of Namibia
 ISO country codes:  NA, NAM, 516
 ISO region codes:  See ISO 3166-2:NA
 Internet country code top-level domain:  .na

Geography of Namibia 

Geography of Namibia
 Namibia is: a sub-Saharan country
 Location:
 Eastern Hemisphere and Southern Hemisphere
 Africa
 Southern Africa
 Time zone:  South African Standard Time (UTC+02)
 Extreme points of Namibia
 High:  Konigstein 
 Low:  South Atlantic Ocean 0 m
 Land boundaries:  3,936 km
 1,376 km
 1,360 km
 967 km
 233 km
 Coastline:  South Atlantic Ocean 1,572 km
 Population of Namibia: 2,074,000  – 141st most populous country
 Area of Namibia: 825,418 km2
 Atlas of Namibia

Environment of Namibia 

 Climate of Namibia
 Geology of Namibia
 Protected areas of Namibia
 National parks of Namibia
 Wildlife of Namibia
 Fauna of Namibia
 Birds of Namibia
 Mammals of Namibia
 Flora of Namibia

Natural geographic features of Namibia 

 Glaciers in Namibia: none
 Islands of Namibia
 Rivers of Namibia
 World Heritage Sites in Namibia

Regions of Namibia

Administrative divisions of Namibia 

 Administrative divisions of Namibia
 Constituencies of Namibia

Namibia has 14 regions:

 Erongo
 Hardap
 ǁKaras
 Kavango East
 Kavango West
 Khomas
 Kunene

 Ohangwena
 Omaheke
 Omusati
 Oshana
 Oshikoto
 Otjozondjupa
 Zambezi

Municipalities of Namibia 

 Capital of Namibia: Windhoek
 Cities of Namibia

Ecoregions of Namibia 

List of ecoregions in Namibia
 Ecoregions in Namibia

Demography of Namibia 

Demographics of Namibia

Government and politics of Namibia 

Politics of Namibia
 Form of government: unitary semi-presidential representative democratic republic
 Capital of Namibia: Windhoek
 Elections in Namibia
 2014 Namibian general election
 2015 Namibian local and regional elections
 Political parties in Namibia
 Taxation in Namibia

Branches of the government of Namibia 

Government of Namibia

Executive branch of the government of Namibia 
 Head of state and head of government: President of Namibia, Hage Geingob
 Cabinet of Namibia
 Prime Minister of Namibia, Saara Kuugongelwa

Legislative branch of the government of Namibia 

 Parliament of Namibia (bicameral)
 Upper house: National Council of Namibia
 Lower house: National Assembly of Namibia

Judicial branch of the government of Namibia 

Court system of Namibia
 Supreme Court of Namibia

Foreign relations of Namibia 

Foreign relations of Namibia
 Diplomatic missions in Namibia
 Diplomatic missions of Namibia
 Namibia-South Africa relations

International organization membership 
The Republic of Namibia is a member of:

African, Caribbean, and Pacific Group of States (ACP)
African Development Bank Group (AfDB)
African Union (AU)
African Union/United Nations Hybrid operation in Darfur (UNAMID)
Commonwealth of Nations
Food and Agriculture Organization (FAO)
Group of 77 (G77)
International Atomic Energy Agency (IAEA)
International Bank for Reconstruction and Development (IBRD)
International Civil Aviation Organization (ICAO)
International Criminal Court (ICCt)
International Criminal Police Organization (Interpol)
International Development Association (IDA)
International Federation of Red Cross and Red Crescent Societies (IFRCS)
International Finance Corporation (IFC)
International Fund for Agricultural Development (IFAD)
International Labour Organization (ILO)
International Maritime Organization (IMO)
International Monetary Fund (IMF)
International Olympic Committee (IOC)
International Organization for Migration (IOM) (observer)
International Organization for Standardization (ISO) (correspondent)
International Red Cross and Red Crescent Movement (ICRM)
International Telecommunication Union (ITU)

International Telecommunications Satellite Organization (ITSO)
Inter-Parliamentary Union (IPU)
Multilateral Investment Guarantee Agency (MIGA)
Nonaligned Movement (NAM)
Organisation for the Prohibition of Chemical Weapons (OPCW)
Southern African Customs Union (SACU)
Southern African Development Community (SADC)
United Nations (UN)
United Nations Conference on Trade and Development (UNCTAD)
United Nations Educational, Scientific, and Cultural Organization (UNESCO)
United Nations High Commissioner for Refugees (UNHCR)
United Nations Industrial Development Organization (UNIDO)
United Nations Mission in Liberia (UNMIL)
United Nations Mission in the Sudan (UNMIS)
United Nations Operation in Cote d'Ivoire (UNOCI)
Universal Postal Union (UPU)
World Confederation of Labour (WCL)
World Customs Organization (WCO)
World Federation of Trade Unions (WFTU)
World Health Organization (WHO)
World Intellectual Property Organization (WIPO)
World Meteorological Organization (WMO)
World Tourism Organization (UNWTO)
World Trade Organization (WTO)

Law and order in Namibia 

Law of Namibia
 Cannabis in Namibia
 Constitution of Namibia
 Crime in Namibia
 Human rights in Namibia
 LGBT rights in Namibia
 Law enforcement in Namibia

Military of Namibia 

Military of Namibia
 Command
 Commander-in-chief: John Mutwa
 Minister of Defence of Namibia: Penda Ya Ndakolo
 Forces
 Namibian Army
 Namibian Navy
 Namibian Marine Corps
 Namibian Air Force
 Namibian Special Forces

Local government in Namibia 

Local government in Namibia

History of Namibia 

History of Namibia

By topic 
History of rail transport in Namibia
History of the Jews in Namibia

Culture of Namibia 

Culture of Namibia
 Cuisine of Namibia
 Languages of Namibia
 National symbols of Namibia
 Coat of arms of Namibia
 Flag of Namibia
 National anthem of Namibia
 Prostitution in Namibia
 Public holidays in Namibia
 Religion in Namibia
 Christianity in Namibia
 Hinduism in Namibia
 Islam in Namibia
 World Heritage Sites in Namibia

Art in Namibia 
 Music of Namibia

Sport in Namibia 

Sport in Namibia
 Football in Namibia
 Namibia at the Olympics

Economy and infrastructure of Namibia 

Economy of Namibia
 Economic rank, by nominal GDP (2018): 126th (one hundred and twenty sixth)
 Agriculture in Namibia
 Communications in Namibia
 Media of Namibia
 List of newspapers in Namibia
 Companies of Namibia
 List of airlines of Namibia
 List of banks in Namibia
 List of state-owned enterprises in Namibia
Currency of Namibia: Dollar
ISO 4217: NAD
 Health care in Namibia
 Mining in Namibia
 Namibia Stock Exchange
 Tourism in Namibia
 Transport in Namibia
 Airports in Namibia
 Rail transport in Namibia
 Roads in Namibia
 Water supply and sanitation in Namibia

Education in Namibia 

Education in Namibia
 List of schools in Namibia
 List of universities in Namibia

See also 

Index of Namibia-related articles
List of international rankings
List of Namibia-related topics
Member state of the Commonwealth of Nations
Member state of the United Nations
Outline of Africa
Outline of geography

References

External links 

 Government
 Republic of Namibia – Namibian Governmental Portal
 orusovo.com Constitution of the Republic of Namibia

 Map of Namibia
 Map of Namibia – Excellent maps of Namibia

 Video of Namibia
 Video of Namibia from The New York Times

 Helpful Links
 Namibian Business Directory

 Namibian news in English
 www.insight.com.na Namibian news in English

Namibia